Tracadie was a provincial electoral district for the Legislative Assembly of New Brunswick, Canada.  It was superseded by the Tracadie-Sheila district in 1995.

Members of the Legislative Assembly

Election results

External links
Website of the Legislative Assembly of New Brunswick

Former provincial electoral districts of New Brunswick